was a Japanese politician of the Democratic Party of Japan, a member of the House of Councillors in the Diet (national legislature). A native of Kunohe District, Iwate and graduate of Chuo University, he was elected to the House of Representatives for the first time in 1993 as a member of Japan Renewal Party after serving in the Iwate Prefectural Assembly for four terms. In 1996 he lost his seat but was re-elected in 2000. After losing his seat again in 2003, he ran for House of Councillors in 2004 and was elected.

References

External links 
  in Japanese.

1942 births
2021 deaths
People from Iwate Prefecture
Chuo University alumni
Members of the House of Representatives (Japan)
Members of the House of Councillors (Japan)
Members of the Iwate Prefectural Assembly
Japan Renewal Party politicians
Democratic Party of Japan politicians